Krush is the debut studio album by Japanese hip hop producer DJ Krush. It was released on January 21, 1994 in Japan by Triad – an imprint of Nippon Columbia – and Chance Records. Shadow Records released the album in the United States in 1995.

Critical reception

Ned Raggett of AllMusic found DJ Krush's production "spare but effective, launching grooves that unfold just enough over the course of his tracks, edgy and slightly unnerving." Raggett wrote that DJ Krush "has a definite sound and style", but "also knows how to create any number of variations or twists with it, with fine results." Reviewing the album for Trouser Press, Mark Kemp dubbed Krush "a milestone, a dizzying collision of genres." Peter Shapiro, writing in Drum 'n' Bass: The Rough Guide (1999), said that it hinted at "the more effective monochromaticism" of DJ Krush's later music. In 2021, Krush was ranked at number 19 on Slant Magazines list of the best trip hop albums of all time.

Track listing

Notes
 The US edition (total length: 48:12) omits "B-Boy Mastamind" and moves "Keeping the Motion" to track two.

Sample credits
 "Ruff-Neck Jam" contains samples of "La Nevada", performed by The Gil Evans Orchestra.
 "Keeping the Motion" contains samples of "Our Generation", performed by Ernie Hines.

Personnel
Credits are adapted from the album's liner notes.

Musicians
 DJ Krush – beats, scratching
 DJ Hide – beats on "Mixed Nuts" and "Another Day"
 DJ Red – scratching and pitch control on "Mixed Nuts", beats on "Another Day"
 Guru – vocals on "B-Boy Mastamind"
 Takeharu Hayakawa – wood bass on "Roll & Tumble"
 Akihiro Ishiwatari – guitar on "Into the Water"
 Kazufumi Kodama – trumpet on "On the Dub-ble"
 Nobutaka Kuwabara – trumpet on "Edge of Blue"
 Osamu Marumoto – bass on "Edge of Blue"
 Monday Michiru – vocals on "Keeping the Motion"
 Midnight City Dwellers (Matsui, Oda, Shingo, DJ Red and DJ Hide) – performance on "AM 300 Tag"
 Koichiro Samukawa – alto saxophone and flute on "Ruff-Neck Jam"
 Ken Shima – piano on "Roll & Tumble"
 Carla Vallet – vocals on "Murder of Soul"
 Sonya Vallet – vocals on "Big City Lover"

Production
 DJ Krush – production, mixing
 Noriko Asano – executive production
 Osamu Marumoto – mixing, recording
 Koichi "Oppenheimer" Matsuki – mixing, recording
 Tomonori Sato – executive production
 Akihiko Takenaka – mastering

Design
 Bruno Dayan – photography
 Sakaguchi Ken Factory – art direction, design

References

External links
 

1994 debut albums
DJ Krush albums
Nippon Columbia albums
Shadow Records albums